Joseph Edwin Tucker (October 17, 1833 – December 13, 1910) was an American politician in the state of Washington. He served in the Washington House of Representatives from 1889 to 1891.

References

Republican Party members of the Washington House of Representatives
1833 births
1910 deaths
19th-century American politicians
People from Friday Harbor, Washington